The Sydney Metropolitan Bus Service Contracts are contracts issued by the Government of New South Wales to metropolitan bus operators in Sydney, Australia. Since 2005, the government has moved from individual contracts with operators to larger contract regions, leading to the consolidation of bus operators.

History

In February 2004 the Unsworth Review of Bus Services conducted by former Transport Minister and Premier Barrie Unsworth, reported its findings to the Carr Government, recommending that the number of contract areas that existed in Sydney be reduced from 87 to 15 with a lead entity identified for each region to negotiate a contract. This was adopted with the first seven-year performance based contract signed in January 2005. By June 2005, eight had been signed. In some cases the existing operators formed joint venture companies to have a single contract with the government while in other regions there were some takeovers.

The contracts resulted in some consolidation of operators. Harris Park Transport and Moores Tours decided to cease operating at short notice in December 2004. Some of Baxter's Bus Lines routes passed to Connex and Transit First in January 2005. Further consolidation took place after the contracts commenced with Baxter's selling its remaining routes to Westbus in September 2006, Transit First selling out to Connex in February 2007.  Veolia (formerly Connex), who operated in regions 10 and 13, took over region 11 operators Crowthers in January 2009 and Caringbah Bus Service in October 2011. The two takeovers resulted in the merger of regions 10 and 11 to form an expanded region 10, reducing the total number of regions to fourteen.

With the contracts coming up for renewal and following a change in government, the O'Farrell Government decided to put the provision of the services out to competitive tender. Transdev NSW was able to negotiate a direct award for regions 10 and 13 after agreeing to provide access to its bus and depot assets at the end of the contracts. The regions operated by State Transit were not included at this stage, however region 6 was tendered out from July 2018.

Under the 2005 contracts, all new buses were purchased by the government and leased to the operators. As a result, when regions have changed hands, all of the post 2005 built buses have remained with the region, with the older buses retained by the outgoing operators.

2020–2023 tenders
With the exception of region 6, the government announced in October 2019 that the contracts for the other thirteen regions will be put out to competitive tender by 2022. These contracts were originally due to expire in 2021 and 2022.

The first three regions to be put out to tender were the three remaining State Transit regions 7 to 9. Tenders for Region 8 opened in June 2020 and closed on 30 September 2020, with Keolis Downer announced as the successful tenderer in May 2021. Tenders for Region 7 opened in August 2020 and closed on 18 December 2020, with Busways announced as the successful tenderer in July 2021. Tenders for Region 9 opened in November 2020, with a joint venture of Transdev and John Holland announced as the successful tenderer in November 2021. The three regions were transitioned to the new operators on these following dates:
 Region 7 (North West) in January 2022
 Region 8 (Northern Beaches) in October 2021
 Region 9 (East) in April 2022

Between December 2021 and August 2022, the remaining 10 regions will be put out to tender in three tranches:
 Tranche 1: Regions 4, 12 and 14. Contracts for Regions 12 and 14 can be consolidated in a single bid. Tenders opened in January 2022 and closed on 14 April 2022. In November 2022, CDC NSW, the incumbent operator for Regions 4 and 14, was awarded the contracts for the three regions, with region 12 to be consolidated into region 14.
 Tranche 2: Regions 3, 5, 10 and 13. Any combination of the four contracts can be consolidated in a single bid. Tenders opened between March and May 2022. In December 2022, Transit Systems NSW, the incumbent operator for Region 3, was awarded the contracts for Regions 3 and 13, with region 13 to be consolidated into region 3. The contracts for Regions 5 and 10, with region 5 consolidated into region 10, were awarded to U-Go Mobility, a new joint venture between UGL and Go-Ahead Group.
 Tranche 3: Regions 1, 2 and 15. Tenders opened between June and August 2022, and contracts are expected to be awarded in March 2023

Livery
A requirement of the contracts is that operators adopt a white and two blues livery as prescribed by Transport for NSW, this was implemented from 2010. Forest Coach Lines' 2005 contract did not require their buses to be repainted blue, hence the livery applied to their buses saw the blue replaced with green. This loophole was closed when the region was tendered in 2012.

Current contracts

Since 2009, there are 14 contract regions in Sydney, each of which is tied to a geographical area. Current contracts commenced prior to 2018 operate for five years, with an option to extend for a further three years. Contracts commenced and awarded since 2018 are for an eight year period.

Upcoming contracts
The following table shows any upcoming bus contracts that have been awarded but are due to commence.

Region details

Region 1
Region 1 covers the outer western suburbs between Blacktown, Penrith, Windsor and Richmond. It also operated route 740 services via the M2 Hills Motorway to Macquarie Centre, which ceased in May 2019.

From 2005, services were operated by the Area 1 Management Company consortium of incumbent operators Busways, Hawkesbury Valley Buses and Westbus. Following a competitive tendering process, on 6 October 2013 Busways took over all services in the region in its own right. In February 2023 following another competitive tendering process, Busways successfully regained region 1

Region 2
Region 2 covers the south western suburbs between Liverpool, Ingleburn and Hoxton Park. Other principal suburbs are Bringelly and Glenfield.
From 2005, services were operated by the Area 2 Management Company consortium of incumbent operators Busabout and Interline. Following a competitive tendering process, on 1 June 2014 Interline took over all services in the region in its own right.

In 2023, it was announced that Transit Systems had won the contract for the region, this region is now being consolidated into region 15 and will cease to exist, the new contract is expected to start in October 2023

Region 3
Region 3 covers the south western suburbs between Parramatta, Liverpool and Bonnyrigg. Other principal suburbs are Cabramatta, Fairfield and Wetherill Park.

From 2005, services were operated by the Area 3 Management Company consortium of incumbent operators Baxter's Bus Lines, Busabout, Hopkinsons, Metro-link and Westbus which operated all routes except Liverpool-Parramatta T-way route T80 which was operated by Western Sydney Buses. Baxter's sold its routes to Westbus in September 2006.

Following a competitive tendering process, on 13 October 2013, Transit Systems took over the operation of the region. Nine years later, in December 2022, following another competitive tender process, Transit Systems retained and was awarded a seven-year contract for the region. The new contact, also covering Region 13 which will be consolidated into region 3, will commence on 6 August 2023 and expire on 30 November 2030.

Region 4
Region 4 covers The Hills district including Parramatta, Pennant Hills, Castle Hill and Rouse Hill. Other principal suburbs are Dural, Blacktown and Baulkham Hills. It also operates services via the M2 Hills Motorway to Macquarie Centre, Chatswood, Milsons Point and the Sydney CBD.

Since 2005, services have been operated by Hillsbus. Hillsbus successfully bid to retain the region with a new contract commencing on 1 August 2014.

Following the short notice cessation of operations by Harris Park Transport, its routes in the Hills District were taken over by Hillsbus on 20 December 2004, then transferred to Sydney Buses as part of region 7 on 28 January 2005, with six routes returning to Region 4 on 25 September 2005.

Following a tendering process, CDC retained and was awarded an eight-year contract for Region 4 in November 2022. The new contact will commence in April 2023.

Region 5
Region 5 covers the south western suburbs between Strathfield, Bankstown and Hurstville. Other principal suburbs are Lakemba, Punchbowl, Roselands and Mortdale. It also operates services to Strathfield and Sydney Olympic Park.

Harris Park Transport routes operated in the St George area and Moore's Tours routes were transferred to Punchbowl Bus Co on 20 December 2004.

From 2005, services were operated by incumbents Pleasure Tours and Punchbowl Bus Company. The Pleasure Tours routes were taken over by Punchbowl Bus Co on 10 July 2005. Punchbowl Bus Co successfully bid to retain the region with a new contract commencing on 1 July 2014. Eight years later, in December 2022, following another competitive tender process, Punchbowl Bus Co was unsuccessful in retaining the contract. U-Go Mobility was awarded a seven-year contract and will take over bus services from Punchbowl Bus Co in July 2023.  The region will be consolidated into region 10 and will cease to exist.

Region 6
Region 6 covers the Inner West and southern suburbs with services extending to the Sydney CBD, Chatswood, Taronga Zoo, Westfield Eastgardens, Bondi Junction, Hurstville and Miranda. Principal suburbs are Ashfield, Burwood, Campsie, Leichhardt, Rockdale and Sydney Olympic Park. The region operates out of Burwood, Kingsgrove, Leichhardt and Tempe depots.

From 2005, the region was operated by State Transit. The contract was renewed 1 July 2013 for five years without a competitive tendering process.

In May 2017, the government announced the operation of region 6 would be contracted out to the private sector. The contract was awarded to Transit Systems with operations commencing on 1 July 2018.

Region 7
Region 7 covers the north western suburbs with services extending to the Sydney CBD. Principal suburbs are Chatswood, Epping, Macquarie Park, North Sydney, Ryde and Parramatta. The region operates out of Ryde depot and Willoughby depot.

From 2005, the region was operated by State Transit. State Transit permanently took control of a few former Harris Park Transport services in September 2005, and the region expanded to cover the whole of Carlingford, Epping and include North Rocks, West Pennant Hills and Beecroft for the first time.

The contract was renewed on 1 July 2013, and again on 1 July 2017 for five years without a competitive tendering process. The contract was put out to competitive tender in 2020 and was awarded to Busways, with operations commencing on 9 January 2022.

Region 8
Region 8 covers the lower North Shore and Northern Beaches with services extending to the Sydney CBD. Principal suburbs are Brookvale, Chatswood, Manly, Mosman, North Sydney and Palm Beach. The region operates out of Brookvale, Mona Vale, North Sydney depots.

From 2005, the region was operated by State Transit. The contract was renewed on 1 July 2013, and again on 1 July 2017 for five years without a competitive tendering process. The contract was put out to competitive tender in 2020 and was awarded to Keolis Downer Northern Beaches, with operations commencing on 31 October 2021.

Region 9
Region 9 covers the Eastern Suburbs with services extending to the Sydney CBD and Leichhardt. Principal suburbs are Bondi Junction, Botany, Maroubra, Mascot, Randwick and Surry Hills. The region operates out of Port Botany, Randwick and Waverley depots.

From 2005, the region was operated by State Transit. The contract was renewed on 1 July 2013, and again on 1 July 2017 for five years without a competitive tendering process. The contract was put out to competitive tender in 2021 and was awarded to Transdev John Holland, with operations commencing on 3 April 2022.

Region 10
Region 10 initially covered the south western suburbs between Bankstown, Sutherland and Engadine. Other principal suburbs are Hurstville, Menai, and Miranda. It also operates services to Burwood, Parramatta and Liverpool. Since 2005, it has been operated by incumbent operator Connex that was later rebranded Veolia Transport, Veolia Transdev then Transdev NSW.

Region 11 was absorbed into Region 10 in September 2009. Region 10 then covered all of the Sutherland Shire. Caringbah Bus Service's routes were taken over by Veolia in October 2011.

On 1 January 2013, Transdev NSW commenced a new contract that was awarded without a competitive tendering process. Maianbar Bundeena Bus Service continue to operate route 989 from Bundeena as a subcontractor to Transdev. In December 2022, following a competitive tender process, U-Go Mobility was awarded a seven-year contract and will take over the services from Transdev in July 2023. The new contract also covers Region 5 which will be consolidated into region 10.

Region 11
Region 11 covered the Miranda, Cronulla, Bundeena area in the Sutherland Shire. Other principal suburbs were Caringbah and Kurnell.

From 2005, services were operated by incumbent operators Caringbah Bus Service, Crowthers and Maianbar Bundeena Bus Service. Crowthers' routes were taken over by Veolia Transport on 1 January 2009. Region 11 was absorbed into Region 10 on 21 September 2009.

Region 12
Region 12 covers the Upper North Shore and Hornsby to Hawkesbury River area with a limited peak hour service extending to the Sydney CBD. Principal suburbs are Chatswood, Gordon, Hornsby, Berowra and Brooklyn.

From 2005, services were operated by Shorelink, which was rebranded TransdevTSL Shorelink in 2008  and then Transdev Shorelink in 2010.

Following the merger of Transdev and Veolia Transport, Transdev Shorelink was merged into Transdev NSW. It successfully bid to retain the region with a new contract commencing on 1 June 2013.

In October 2019, the NSW Government announced that it would open 13 out of the 14 contracts for competitive tender. Transport for NSW also indicated that Regions 12 and 14 may be procured together. In January 2022, tendering was opened for Regions 12, 14 and 4, closing on 14 April 2022. In November 2022, CDC was successfully awarded the contract for the region and will take over the services from Transdev in May 2023. The region will be consolidated into Region 14 and will cease to exist.

Region 13
Region 13 covers the south western suburbs between Lidcombe, Granville, Bankstown and Liverpool. Other principal suburbs are Burwood and Parramatta.

Baxter's Bus Lines' routes in region 13 were transferred to Connex and Transit First on 1 January 2005.

From 2005, services were operated by incumbent operators Connex (that was later rebranded Veolia Transport, Veolia Transdev then Transdev NSW) and Transit First. In February 2007. Connex purchased Transit First.

On 1 May 2013, Transdev NSW commenced a new contract that was awarded without a competitive tendering process. In December 2022, following a competitive tender process, Transit Systems NSW was awarded the contract for the region and will take over the services from Transdev on 6 August 2023. The region will be consolidated into region 3 and will cease to exist.

Region 14
Region 14 covers the Forest district including Chatswood, Belrose, Frenchs Forest, Terrey Hills, St Ives and Gordon. It also operates services to the Sydney CBD.

Since 2005, the region been operated by Forest Coach Lines. It successfully bid to retain the region with a new contract commencing on 1 April 2013.

In October 2019, the NSW Government announced that it would open 13 out of the 14 contracts for competitive tender. In January 2022, tendering was opened for Regions 12, 14 and 4, closing on 14 April 2022. Transport for NSW has also indicated that Regions 12 and 14 may be procured together. In November 2022, CDC retained and was awarded a seven-year contract for Region 14. The new contract, also covering Region 12 which will be consolidated into region 14, will commence in May 2023.

Region 15
Region 15 covers the south western suburbs between Campbelltown and Camden . Other principal suburbs are Narellan and Macarthur. It also operates services to Wollongong.

From 2005, the region was operated by Busways. Following a competitive tendering process, on 1 June 2014 Busabout took over the operation of the region.

In 2023, it was announced that Transit Systems had won the contract for the region, with Region 2 being consolidated into region 15, The contract is expected to start in October 2023

Patronage

See also
Outer Sydney Metropolitan Bus Service Contracts
Bus operators in Sydney

References

Bus transport in Sydney